Kovi Manisekaran (2 May 1927 – 18 November 2021) was an Indian Tamil scholar, film director and actor. He was awarded Sahitya Akademi Award for Tamil for his historical novel Kutrala Kurinji in 1992.

Biography
Manisekaran was born on 2 May 1927 in Sullivanpet, now (Vellore District), British India. He published for more than 50 years. He wrote eight plays, 29 short story collections, 30 social novels, 50 historical novels and eight essays. He is most noted for his historical novels. He was the recipient of several prestigious awards including the most honourable Sahitya Akademi Award for Tamil for his historical novel Kutrala Kurinji in the year 1992. He also directed two Tamil and one Kannada film. He was an assistant to noted Tamil film director K. Balachandar for three years. His film Thennankeetru won the Tamil Nadu film fans association award and the Government of Karnataka's Neerikshe award.

Manisekaran died in Chennai on 18 November 2021, at the age of 94.

Awards
Sahitya Academy Award for Tamil (1990)
S. P. Adithanar award from Dina Thanthi

Partial bibliography
Kutrala Kurunji
Nayakka Madevigal
Gangai Nachiyar
Malaya Maarudham
Therodum Veedhiyilae
Taj Mahal
Nithirai Megangal
Thirisooli
Varaaga Nadhikarayil
Kanchi Kathiravan
Kalayar Kovil Radham
Karru Veliyidai Kannamma
Gandhari
Kollipaavai
Koduthu sivandha kaigal
Kudavayil Kottam
Ilavarasi Mohanangi
Ajatha Sathru
Pon Veindha perumaal
Mani pallavam

Filmography
Thennankeeru (made in Tamil and Kannada)
Yaagasalai

References

1927 births
2021 deaths
Indian male essayists
Indian male novelists
Indian male short story writers
Recipients of the Sahitya Akademi Award in Tamil
Tamil film directors
Tamil writers
Writers from Tamil Nadu